Heiðr (also rendered Heid, Hed, Heith, Hetha etc, from the Old Norse adjective meaning "bright"  or the noun meaning "honour") is a Norse female personal name.

It may refer to the seeress and witch (völva) mentioned in one stanza of Völuspá, related to the story of the Æsir-Vanir war:

Heith they named her
who sought their home,
The wide-seeing witch,
in magic wise;
Minds she bewitched
that were moved by her magic,
To evil women
a joy she was.

—Völuspá (22), Bellows’ translation

The general assumption is that here, "Heiðr" is an alternate name for the witch Gullveig, mentioned in the previous stanza, who, in turn, is often thought to be a hypostasis of Freyja. But it is sometimes argued that the völva who recites the poem refers to herself.

Heiðr is also a seeress in several works such as Landnámabók (S 179 / H 45), Hrólfs saga kraka (3) and Örvar-Odds saga (2), where she predicts Örvar's death.

Heiðr is also the name of a child of the giant Hrímnir according to Völuspá hin skamma (Hyndluljóð, 32).

Saxo Grammaticus reported a shield-maiden bearing this name as captain of the contingent from Sle fighting for the Danes at the Battle of Brávellir in the year 750. She was said to be the daughter of King Harald Hildetand.

References

Legendary Norsemen
Witchcraft in folklore and mythology
Characters in Norse mythology
Germanic seeresses